The 2007 Formula Renault 3.5 Series was the third Formula Renault 3.5 Series season. began on 14 April 2007 in Monza, Italy and finished in Barcelona, Spain on 28 October 2007 after 17 races.

Regulation Changes

Technical

New to the Formula Renault 3.5 Series for the 2007 season was a 'push to pass' system, similar to the one that was used in the Champ Car World Series. In a bid to promote more overtaking, drivers were now be able to boost their power for up to 60 seconds per race.

The cars also featured modifications to the gearbox, shock absorbers, rear anti-roll bar and steering system.

Sporting

A number of new rules were introduced for 2007 in order to improve the racing and to create more excitement:

 Firstly, the length of the first race at each meeting was extended, meaning that both races would now last for approximately 45 minutes (except Monaco, where there was only one race).
 The grid for Race one was still be decided by a 20-minute Qualifying session, but the grid for Race two was now determined by the finishing order of the first race, with the top 10 positions reversed.
 Points were also awarded to the top 3 drivers in each qualifying group for Race one. The 30 drivers were split into two groups of 15 for the 20-minute session, with the fastest driver in each group receiving 4 points, the second fastest 2 with 1 point awarded to the third fastest.

Pre-Season Testing Results

Teams and drivers

 = Series rookie for 2007

Race calendar and results
Eight rounds formed meetings of the 2007 World Series by Renault season, with an additional round supporting the 2007 Monaco Grand Prix.

Notes:
 The round originally scheduled to take place at Istanbul Park on 23 June and 24 was cancelled by series organisers on 2 April. The Estoril circuit in Portugal hosted the replacement round, taking place over the weekend of 20 October and 21.

Season results

 Points for both championships were awarded as follows:

In addition, two points were awarded for the fastest lap in each race.

The maximum number of points a driver could earn each weekend (except Monaco) was 31 and the maximum number for a team was 55.

Drivers' Championship

 Polesitter for feature race in bold
 Driver in italics has been awarded two points for fastest lap
 † — Drivers did not finish the race, but were classified as they completed over 90% of the race distance.
  – Rookie Cup

Teams' Championship

References

2007 in motorsport
2007
2007 in European sport
Renault 3.5